This is a list of schools in Norfolk, England.

See also Norfolk County Council.

State-funded schools

Primary schools

Acle St Edmunds CE Primary School, Acle
Admirals Academy, Thetford
Alburgh with Denton CE Primary Academy, Alburgh
Aldborough Primary School, Aldborough
All Saints Academy, Stoke Ferry
All Saints CE Primary School, Stibbard
All Saints CE Primary School, Winfarthing
Alpington and Bergh Apton CE Primary School, Alpington
Angel Road Infant School, Norwich
Angel Road Junior School, Norwich
Antingham and Southrepps Primary School, Southrepps
Arden Grove Infant and Nursery School, Hellesdon
Ashill Primary School, Ashill
Ashleigh Primary School, Wymondham
Ashwicken CE Primary School, Ashwicken
Aslacton Primary School, Aslacton
Astley Primary School, Melton Constable
Attleborough Primary School, Attleborough
Avenue Junior School, Norwich
Bacton Primary School, Bacton
Banham Primary School, Banham
Barford Primary School, Barford
Barnham Broom CE Primary School, Barnham Broom
The Bawburgh School, Bawburgh
Bawdeswell Community Primary School, Bawdeswell
Beeston Primary School, Beeston
The Belfry CE Primary School, Overstrand
Bignold Primary School and Nursery, Norwich
The Bishop's CE Primary Academy, Thetford
Blakeney CE Primary School, Blakeney
Blenheim Park Academy, Sculthorpe
Blofield Primary School, Blofield
Bluebell Primary School, Norwich
Brancaster CE Primary Academy, Brancaster
Bressingham Primary School, Bressingham
Brisley CE Primary Academy, Brisley
Brooke CE Primary School, Brooke
Browick Road Primary School, Wymondham
Brundall Primary School, Brundall
Bunwell Primary School, Bunwell
Bure Valley School, Aylsham
Burnham Market Primary School, Burnham Market
Burston Community Primary School, Burston
Buxton Primary School, Buxton
Caister Infant and Nursery School, Caister-on-Sea
Caister Junior School, Caister-on-Sea
Cantley Primary School, Cantley
Carleton Rode CE Primary School, Carleton Rode
Castle Acre CE Primary Academy, Castle Acre
Caston CE Primary Academy, Caston
Catfield CE Primary School, Catfield
Catton Grove Primary School, Norwich
Cawston CE Primary Academy, Cawston
Cecil Gowing Infant School, Sprowston
Chapel Break Infant School, Bowthorpe
Charles Darwin Primary School, Norwich
Cherry Tree Infant Academy, Marham
Cherry Tree Junior Academy, Marham
Clenchwarton Primary School, Clenchwarton
Clover Hill VA Infant School, Bowthorpe
Cobholm Primary Academy, Great Yarmouth
Colby Primary School, Colby
Colkirk CE Primary Academy, Colkirk
Colman Infant School, Norwich
Colman Junior School, Norwich
Coltishall Primary School, Coltishall
Corpusty Primary School, Corpusty
Costessey Primary School, Costessey
Cringleford CE Primary School, Cringleford
Cromer Junior School, Cromer
Denver Primary School, Denver
Dereham CE Infant School, Dereham
Dereham CE Junior Academy, Dereham
Dersingham Primary School, Dersingham
Diamond Academy, Thetford
Dickleburgh CE Primary Academy, Dickleburgh
Diss CE Junior Academy, Diss
Diss Infant Academy, Diss
Ditchingham CE Primary Academy, Ditchingham
Docking CE Primary Academy, Docking
Drake Primary School, Thetford
Drayton CE Junior School, Drayton
Drayton Community Infant School, Drayton
Duchy of Lancaster Methwold CE Primary School, Methwold
Dussindale Primary School, Thorpe St Andrew
Earsham CE Primary School, Earsham
East Harling Primary School, East Harling
East Ruston Infant School, East Ruston
Eastgate Academy, King's Lynn
Eaton Primary School, Norwich
Edith Cavell Academy, Norwich
Edmund de Moundeford Primary School, Feltwell
Edward Worlledge Ormiston Academy, Great Yarmouth
Ellingham Primary School, Ellingham
Emneth Academy, Emneth
Erpingham CE Primary School, Erpingham
Fairhaven CE Primary School, South Walsham
Fairstead Community Primary School, Fairstead
Fakenham Infant School, Fakenham
Fakenham Junior School, Fakenham
Falcon Junior School, Sprowston
Filby Primary School, Filby
Firside Junior School, Hellesdon
Fleggburgh CE Primary School, Fleggburgh
Flitcham CE Primary Academy, Flitcham
Forncett St Peter CE Primary School, Forncett
Foulsham Primary School, Foulsham
The Free School Norwich
Freethorpe Community Primary School, Freethorpe
Frettenham Primary School, Frettenham
Garboldisham CE Primary Academy, Garboldisham
Garrick Green Infant School, Old Catton
Garvestone Community Primary School, Garvestone
Gayton CE Primary Academy, Gayton
Gaywood Primary School, Gaywood
George White Junior School, Norwich
Ghost Hill Infant School, Taverham
Gillingham St Michael's CE Primary Academy, Gillingham
Glebeland Community Primary School, Beccles
Gooderstone CE Primary Academy, Gooderstone
Great Dunham Primary School, Great Dunham
Great Ellingham Primary School, Great Ellingham
Great Hockham Primary School, Great Hockham
Great Massingham CE Primary School, Great Massingham
Great Witchingham CE Primary Academy, Lenwade
Great Yarmouth Primary Academy, Great Yarmouth
Greenpark Academy, King's Lynn
Gresham Village School, Gresham
Greyfriars Academy, King's Lynn
Grove House Infant School, Dereham
Hainford Primary School, Hainford
Happisburgh Primary School, Happisburgh
Hapton CE Primary School, Hapton
Harleston Sancroft Academy, Harleston
Harpley CE Primary School, Harpley
Heacham Infant School, Heacham
Heacham Junior School, Heacham
Heartsease Primary Academy, Norwich
Heartwood CE Primary School, Swaffham
Heather Avenue Infant School, Hellesdon
Hemblington Primary School, Blofield
Hempnall Primary School, Hempnall
Hemsby Primary School, Hemsby
Henderson Green Primary School, Norwich
Hethersett Primary School, Hethersett
Hethersett Woodside Primary School, Hethersett
Hevingham Primary School, Hevingham
Hickling CE Infant School, Hickling
Highgate Infant School, King's Lynn
Hilgay Riverside Academy, Hilgay
Hillcrest Primary School, Downham Market
Hillside Avenue Primary School, Thorpe St Andrew
Hillside Primary School, Bradwell
Hindringham CE Primary School, Hindringham
Hingham Primary School, Hingham
Hockering CE Primary Academy, Hockering
Holly Meadows School, Pott Row
Holt Community Primary School, Holt
Holy Cross CE Primary School, Runcton Holme
Homefield CE Primary School, Bradwell
Hopton CE Primary Academy, Hopton-on-Sea
Horning Community Primary School, Horning
Horsford CE Primary School, Horsford
Howard Junior School, Gaywood
Hunstanton Primary School, Hunstanton
Iceni Academy, Methwold
Ingoldisthorpe CE Primary School, Ingoldisthorpe
John of Gaunt Infant School, Aylsham
Kelling CE Primary School, Kelling
Kenninghall Primary School, Kenninghall
King's Oak Academy, Gaywood
King's Park Infant School, Dereham
Kinsale Infant School, Hellesdon
Kinsale Junior School, Hellesdon
Lakenham Primary School, Norwich
Langham Village School, Langham
Lingwood Primary Academy, Norwich
Lionwood Infant School, Norwich
Lionwood Junior School, Norwich
Litcham School, Litcham
Little Melton Primary School, Little Melton
Little Plumstead CE Primary School, Little Plumstead
Little Snoring Community Primary Academy, Little Snoring
Loddon Infant School, Loddon
Loddon Junior School, Loddon
Lodge Lane Infant School, Old Catton
Ludham Primary Schooly, Ludham
Lyng CE Primary Academy, Lyng
Magdalen Academy, King's Lynn
Magdalen Gates Primary School, Norwich
Manor Field Infant School, Long Stratton
Marsham Primary School, Marsham
Marshland St James Primary School, Marshland St James
Martham Academy, Martham
Mattishall Primary School, Mattishall
Middleton CE Primary Academy, Middleton
Mile Cross Primary School, Norwich
Millfield Primary School, North Walsham
Moorlands CE Primary Academy, Belton
Morley CE Primary Academy, Morley Saint Botolph
Mousehold Infant School, Norwich
Mulbarton Primary School, Mulbarton
Mundesley Infant School, Mundesley
Mundesley Junior School, Mundesley
Mundford CE Primary Academy, Mundford
Narborough CE Primary Academy, Narborough
Neatishead CE Primary School, Neatishead
Necton Primary School, Necton
Nelson Academy, Downham Market
Nelson Infant School, Norwich
Newton Flotman Primary School, Newton Flotman
Nightingale Infant School, Taverham
The Norman CE Primary School, Northwold
North Denes Primary School, Great Yarmouth
North Elmham CE Primary School, North Elmham
North Walsham Infant School, North Walsham
North Walsham Junior School, North Walsham
North Wootton Academy, North Wootton
Northgate Primary School, Great Yarmouth
Northrepps Primary School, Northrepps
Norwich Primary Academy, Norwich
Norwich Road Academy, Thetford
Old Buckenham Primary School, Old Buckenham
Old Catton CE Junior School, Old Catton
Ormesby Village Infant School, Ormesby St Margaret
Ormesby Village Junior School, Ormesby St Margaret
Ormiston Cliff Park Primary Academy, Gorleston-on-Sea
Ormiston Herman Academy, Gorleston-on-Sea
Parker's CE Primary Academy, Saham Toney
Peterhouse CE Primary Academy, Gorleston-on-Sea
Poringland Primary School, Poringland
Preston CE Primary School, Tasburgh
Pulham CE Primary School, Pulham Market
Queen's Hill Primary School, Costessey
Queensway Infant Academy, Thetford
Rackheath Primary School, Rackheath
Raleigh Infant Academy, Thetford
Recreation Road Infant School, Norwich
Redcastle Family School, Thetford
Reedham Primary School, Reedham
Reepham Primary School, Reepham
Reffley Academy, King's Lynn
Robert Kett Primary School, Wymondham
Rockland St Mary Primary School, Rockland St Mary
Rocklands Community Primary School, Rocklands
Rollesby Primary School, Rollesby
Rosecroft Primary School, Attleborough
Roydon Primary School, Roydon
Rudham CE Primary Academy, East Rudham
Sacred Heart RC Primary School, Swaffham
St Andrew's CE Primary School, North Lopham
St Augustine's RC Primary School, Costessey
St Clements Hill Primary Academy, Norwich
St Faiths' CE Primary School, Horsham St Faith
St Francis of Assisi RC Primary School, Norwich
St George's Primary School, Great Yarmouth
St Germans Academy, Wiggenhall St Germans
St John's Community Primary School, Hoveton
St Martha's RC Primary School, Gaywood
St Martin at Shouldham CE Primary Academy, Shouldham
St Mary and St Peter RC Primary School, Gorleston-on-Sea
St Mary's CE Junior School, Long Stratton
St Mary's CE Primary School, Roughton
St Mary's Community Primary School, Beetley
St Michael's CE Academy, King's Lynn
St Michael's CE Primary School, Aylsham
St Michael's Junior School, Bowthorpe
St Nicholas Priory CE Primary School, Great Yarmouth
St Peter and St Paul CE Primary Academy, Carbrooke
St Peter's CE Primary Academy, Easton
St William's Primary School, Thorpe St Andrew
Salhouse CE Primary School, Salhouse
Sandringham and West Newton CE Primary Academy, West Newton
Saxlingham Nethergate CE Primary School, Saxlingham Nethergate
Scarning Primary School, Scarning
Scole CE Primary School, Scole
Sculthorpe CE Primary Academy, Sculthorpe
Seething and Mundham Primary School, Seething
Sheringham Community Primary School, Sheringham
Snettisham Primary School, Snettisham
South Wootton Infant School, South Wootton
South Wootton Junior School, South Wootton
Southery Academy, Southery
Southtown Primary School, Great Yarmouth
Sparhawk Infant School, Sprowston
Spixworth Infant School, Spixworth
Spooner Row Primary School, Spooner Row
Sporle CE Primary Academy, Sporle
Sprowston Infant School, Sprowston
Sprowston Junior School, Sprowston
Stalham Academy, Stalham
Stalham Infant School, Stalham
Stoke Holy Cross Primary School, Stoke Holy Cross
Stradbroke Primary Academy, Gorleston-on-Sea
Suffield Park Infant School, Cromer
Surlingham Primary School, Surlingham
Sutton CE Infant School, Sutton
Swaffham CE Primary Academy, Swaffham
Swanton Abbott Community Primary School, Swanton Abbott
Swanton Morley Primary School, Swanton Morley
Tacolneston CE Primary Academy, Tacolneston
Taverham CE Junior School, Taverham
Ten Mile Bank Riverside Academy, Ten Mile Bank
Terrington St Clement Community School, Terrington St Clement
Terrington St John Primary School, Terrington St John
Thomas Bullock CE Primary Academy, Shipdham
Thompson Primary School, Thompson
Thurlton Primary School, Thurlton
Thurton Primary School, Thurton
Tilney All Saints CE Primary School, Tilney All Saints
Tilney St Lawrence Community Primary School, Tilney St Lawrence
Tivetshall Community Primary School, Tivetshall St Mary
Toftwood Infant School, Toftwood
Trowse Primary School, Trowse
Tuckswood Academy, Norwich
Tunstead Primary School, Tunstead
Upwell Academy, Upwell
Valley Primary Academy, Norwich
Walpole Cross Keys Primary School, Walpole Cross Keys
Walpole Highway Primary School, Walpole Highway
Walsingham CE Primary School, Walsingham
Watlington Community Primary School, Watlington
Watton Junior School, Watton
Watton Westfield Infant School, Watton
Weasenham CE Primary Academy, Weasenham All Saints
Weeting CE Primary School, Weeting
Wells-next-the-Sea Primary School, Wells-next-the-Sea
Wensum Junior School, Norwich
West Earlham Infant School, Norwich
West Earlham Junior School, Norwich
West Lynn Primary School, West Lynn
West Walton Community Primary School, West Walton
West Winch Primary School, West Winch
White House Farm Primary School, Norwich
White Woman Lane Junior School, Sprowston
Whitefriars CE Primary Academy, King's Lynn
Wicklewood Primary School, Wicklewood
Wimbotsham and Stow Academy, Wimbotsham
Winterton Primary School, Winterton-on-Sea
Woodland View Junior School, Spixworth
Woodlands Primary Academy, Bradwell
Woodton Primary School, Woodton
Worstead CE Primary School, Worstead
Wreningham Primary School, Wreningham
Wroughton Infant Academy, Gorleston-on-Sea
Wroughton Junior Academy, Gorleston-on-Sea
Wymondham College Prep School, Morley
Yaxham CE Primary School, Yaxham

Secondary schools

Acle Academy, Acle
Alderman Peel High School, Wells-next-the-Sea
Attleborough Academy, Attleborough
Aylsham High School, Aylsham
Broadland High Ormiston Academy, Hoveton
Caister Academy, Caister-on-Sea
City Academy Norwich, Norwich
City of Norwich School, Norwich
Cliff Park Ormiston Academy, Gorleston-on-Sea
Cromer Academy, Cromer
Dereham Neatherd High School, Dereham
Diss High School, Diss
Downham Market Academy, Downham Market
Fakenham Academy, Fakenham
Flegg High Ormiston Academy, Martham
Framingham Earl High School, Framingham Earl
Great Yarmouth Charter Academy, Great Yarmouth
Harleston Sancroft Academy, Harleston
Hellesdon High School, Hellesdon
Hethersett Academy, Hethersett
The Hewett Academy, Norwich
Hobart High School, Loddon
Iceni Academy, Methwold
Jane Austen College, Norwich
King Edward VII Academy, King's Lynn
King's Lynn Academy, King's Lynn
Litcham School, Litcham
Long Stratton High School, Long Stratton
Lynn Grove Academy, Gorleston-on-Sea
Marshland High School, West Walton
The Nicholas Hamond Academy, Swaffham
North Walsham High School, North Walsham
Northgate High School, Dereham
Notre Dame High School, Norwich
Old Buckenham High School, Old Buckenham
Open Academy, Norwich
Ormiston Venture Academy, Great Yarmouth
Ormiston Victory Academy, Costessey
Reepham High School and College, Reepham
St Clement's High School, Terrington St Clement
Sewell Park Academy, Norwich
Sheringham High School, Sheringham
Smithdon High School, Hunstanton
Springwood High School, King's Lynn
Sprowston Community Academy, Sprowston
Stalham High School, Stalham
Taverham High School, Taverham
The Thetford Academy, Thetford
Thorpe St Andrew School, Thorpe St Andrew
University Technical College Norfolk, Norwich
Wayland Academy, Watton
Wymondham College, Morley
Wymondham High Academy, Wymondham

Special and alternative schools

The Bridge Easton, Easton
Bure Park Specialist Academy, Great Yarmouth
Chapel Green School, Old Buckenham
Churchill Park School, King's Lynn
The Clare School, Norwich
Eaton Hall Specialist Academy, Norwich
The Fen Rivers Academy, King's Lynn
Fred Nicholson School, East Dereham
Hall School, Norwich
Harford Manor School, Norwich
John Grant School, Great Yarmouth
The Parkside Special School, Norwich
The Pinetree School, Thetford
Sheringham Woodfields School, Sheringham
Short Stay School for Norfolk, Norwich
Sidestrand Hall School, Sidestrand
The Wherry School, Norwich

Further education

Dereham Sixth Form College
East Norfolk Sixth Form College
Easton & Otley College
Great Yarmouth College
Norwich City College
Paston College
Sir Isaac Newton Sixth Form
The College of West Anglia

Independent schools

Primary and preparatory schools
Beeston Hall School, West Runton
Downham Preparatory School, Stow Bardolph
Glebe House School, Hunstanton
Langley Preparatory School, Taverham
Notre Dame Preparatory School, Norwich
Riddlesworth Hall School, Diss
Town Close School, Norwich

Senior and all-through schools

All Saints School, Lessingham
Gresham's School, Holt
Langley School, Loddon
Norwich High School for Girls, Norwich
Norwich School, Norwich
Norwich Steiner School, Norwich
OneSchool Global UK, Swaffham
Thetford Grammar School, Thetford

Special and alternative schools

Acorn Park School, Banham
Argyll House, Cromer
Aurora Eccles School, Quidenham
Aurora White House School, Attleborough
Avocet House, Heckingham
Banks House School, Norwich
The Damara School, Thetford
Future Education, Norwich
Include Schools Norfolk, Norwich
Kingsbrook School, Thetford
Novaturient School, Great Yarmouth
Red Balloon Learner Centre, Norwich
St Andrew's School, Aylmerton
Sheridan House School, Northwold
The Stables Independent School, Brumstead
Turnstone House School, Kirby Cane
Westfield House School, Terrington St Clement

Norfolk
Schools in Norfolk
Lists of buildings and structures in Norfolk